Barkas is a surname. Notable people with the surname include:

Harry Barkas (1906–1974), English footballer
Mary Barkas (1889–1959), New Zealand psychiatrist, physician and author
Ned Barkas (1901–1962), English footballer
Sam Barkas (1909–1989), English footballer and manager
Tommy Barkas (1912–1991), English footballer
Walter H. Barkas (1912–1969), American physicist
Vasilis Barkas (born 1994), Greek footballer